is a city located in Fukuoka Prefecture, Japan.

As of April 30, 2017, the city has a population of 38,223 and a population density of 360 persons per km². The total area is 105.12 km².

The modern city of Miyama was established on January 29, 2007, from the merger of the town of Takata (from Miike District), and the towns of Setaka and Yamakawa (both from Yamato District).

References

External links

 Miyama City official website 

 
Cities in Fukuoka Prefecture